The islands of Saint-Paul and Amsterdam, formerly the islands of Saint-Paul and New Amsterdam, form a district of the French Southern and Antarctic Lands made up of the islands of Saint-Paul and Amsterdam, 91 km apart from each other. This district is located in the southern Indian Ocean at the southwestern end of the Australian plate, approximately 1,325 km north-northeast of the Kerguelen Islands. The population is about twenty-five people in winter and fifty people in summer.

See also 

 Amsterdam Island 
 Saint Paul Island
 French Southern and Antarctic Lands

References

Islands of the French Southern and Antarctic Lands